Scoliocentra is a genus of flies in the family Heleomyzidae. There are at least 40 described species in Scoliocentra.

Species
These 44 species belong to the genus Scoliocentra:

S. alpina (Loew, 1862) c g
S. amplicornis (Czerny, 1924) c g
S. biconfusa Gorodkov, 1972 c g
S. borealis (Czerny, 1924) i c g
S. brachypterna (Loew, 1873) c g
S. caesia (Meigen, 1830) i c g
S. caucasicus Woznica, 2006 c g
S. ceianui Martinek, 1985 c g
S. collini Woznica, 2004 c g
S. confusa (Wahlgren, 1918) i c g
S. czekanowskii Gorodkov, 1977 c g
S. czernyi Papp & Woznica, 1993 c g
S. defessa (Osten Sacken, 1877) i c g
S. dupliciseta (Strobl, 1894) c g
S. engeli (Czerny, 1928) c g
S. europaeus Papp & Woznica, 1993 c g
S. flavotestacea (Zetterstedt, 1838) i c g
S. fraterna Loew, 1863 i c g
S. glauca (Aldrich and Darlington, 1908) i c g
S. gonea (Garrett, 1925) i c g
S. gorodkovi Papp & Woznica, 1993 c g
S. helvola Loew, 1862 i c g
S. infuscata (Gill, 1962) i c g
S. kamtschatica Gorodkov, 1963 c g
S. mariei (Séguy, 1934) c g
S. martineki Papp & Woznica, 1993 c g
S. mongolicus Papp & Woznica, 1993 c g
S. nigrinervis (Wahlgren, 1918) c g
S. obscuriventris Gorodkov, 1972 c g
S. perplexa (Garrett, 1924) i c g
S. sabroskyi (Gill, 1962) i c g
S. sackeni (Garrett, 1925) i c g
S. scutellaris (Zetterstedt, 1838) c g
S. scutellata (Garrett, 1921) i c g
S. soosi Papp & Woznica, 1993 c g
S. spectabilis (Loew, 1862) i c g
S. thoracica Collin, 1935 i c g
S. tianshanica Gorodkov, 1977 c g
S. tincta (Walker, 1849)
S. triangulata (Garrett, 1925) i c g
S. troglodytes (Loew, 1863) c g
S. tularensis (Gill, 1962) i c g
S. ventricosa (Becker, 1907) c g
S. villosa (Meigen, 1830) c g

Data sources: i = ITIS, c = Catalogue of Life, g = GBIF, b = Bugguide.net

References

Further reading

External links

 

Heleomyzidae
Articles created by Qbugbot
Sphaeroceroidea genera
Taxa named by Hermann Loew